Kyrylo Doroshenko (born 17 November 1989) is a professional Ukrainian football midfielder.

Career
Doroshenko is a product of FC Shakhtar Donetsk sportive school. He spent time with different Ukrainian teams that play in the Ukrainian First League.

References

External links
 
 

1989 births
Living people
People from Novomoskovsk
Ukrainian footballers
Ukrainian expatriate footballers
Expatriate footballers in Belarus
Expatriate footballers in Georgia (country)
Association football midfielders
Ukrainian Premier League players
FC Shakhtar Donetsk players
FC Shakhtar-2 Donetsk players
FC Shakhtar-3 Donetsk players
FC Stal Alchevsk players
FC Zirka Kropyvnytskyi players
FC Olimpik Donetsk players
FC Zorya Luhansk players
FC Mariupol players
FC Torpedo-BelAZ Zhodino players
FC Inhulets Petrove players
FC Kolkheti-1913 Poti players
FC VPK-Ahro Shevchenkivka players
Sportspeople from Dnipropetrovsk Oblast